Roman Gennadyevich Oreshchuk (born 2 September 1975) is a Russian professional football official and a former agent and player.

Playing career
He made his debut in the Russian Premier League in 1993 for PFC CSKA Moscow. He played 2 games in the UEFA Cup 2001–02 for FC Chernomorets Novorossiysk.

Post-playing career
He was appointed the sports director of FC Dynamo Moscow on 1 June 2016, and left Dynamo "by mutual consent" on 6 September 2016.

Honours
 Russian Second Division Zone Ural/Povolzhye top scorer: 2003 (23 goals).

References

1975 births
Living people
Russian footballers
Russia youth international footballers
Russia under-21 international footballers
FC Chernomorets Novorossiysk players
PFC CSKA Moscow players
FC Rostov players
Legia Warsaw players
APOEL FC players
Újpest FC players
FC Lada-Tolyatti players
FC Salyut Belgorod players
FC Sokol Saratov players
FC Sodovik Sterlitamak players
Russian Premier League players
Nemzeti Bajnokság I players
Ekstraklasa players
Cypriot First Division players
Russian expatriate footballers
Expatriate footballers in Poland
Russian expatriate sportspeople in Poland
Expatriate footballers in Cyprus
Russian expatriate sportspeople in Cyprus
Expatriate footballers in Hungary
Russian expatriate sportspeople in Hungary
People from Novorossiysk
Association football forwards
FC Dynamo Saint Petersburg players
FC Nosta Novotroitsk players
FC Sportakademklub Moscow players
Sportspeople from Krasnodar Krai